Jerome Woods (born March 5, 1970, in Benton Harbor, Michigan), better known by his stage name Rome, is an American R&B singer.

Woods sang in a cover band called Fire & Ice while a high schooler, and toured regionally both as a solo artist and with the band. He attended Oakwood University but dropped out in 1989 and moved to California in hopes of making a career as a singer. He toured with Vesta but had little success until he met with Gerald Baillergeau and Victor Merrit, the producers who heard his demo and sent it to RCA Records. RCA signed him and released his eponymous debut album in 1997, which went on to sell over half a million copies in the U.S., mainly on the strength of the single "I Belong to You (Every Time I See Your Face)", which peaked at #6 in the U.S. He had two Top 40 hits from the album.

Having achieved success with his RCA Records debut, a projected second album was rejected. Instead, he signed a distribution deal with Ground Level for his own label follow-up - Rome2000: Thank You, but the material recorded while under contract to RCA has never been released. In 2001, he returned with two albums: To The Highest and To Infinity (Thank You); the last one is just an alternative edition of Rome2000: Thank You. Do It followed in 2003, and three years later Sony issued Rome's Best Of, which has only 10 songs from his 1997 debut.

Discography

Albums

Singles

Guest appearances and compilations
SWV It's All About U cd2 1996 RCA records cds
Song: "Use Your Heart"
SoulTrain Christmas StarFest 1997 Sony records
Song: "Have Yourself A Merry Little Christmas"
Danesha Starr featuring ROME Interscope 1998 cds
Song "As Long As I Live"
Sylk-E. Fyne Raw Sylk 1998 RCA records
Song: "I Missed My Loved Ones"
Blade Original Soundtrack 1998 TVT records
Song: "Fightin' A War"
Held Up Original Soundtrack 2000
Song: "Ride Baby"
Bobby Brown Forever 1997 MCA records
Song: "Heart and Soul", "Give It Up"

Music videos

References

External links
 Rome at MySpace

American rhythm and blues musicians
Musicians from Michigan
Living people
1970 births